Muhammad Javed is the name of:

 Muhammad Javed Ikhlas (born 1955), mayor of Rawalpindi, Pakistan
 Muhammad Javed Buttar (born 1948), former justice of Supreme Court of Pakistan
 Makhdoom Muhammad Javed Hashmi (born 1948), Pakistani politician
 Muhammad Javed (cricketer) (born 1964), Pakistani cricketer
 Muhammad Javed (field hockey), Pakistani field-hockey player in 2008 Olympics team squad